Qaradagh may refer to:
 Qaradagh, Iran
 Qaradagh, Iraq